Ronald William Henry Turnbull Hudson (16 July 1876 – 20 September 1904) was a British mathematician.

Ronald W.H.T. Hudson was considered in his day to be the most gifted geometer in all of Cambridge.  Hudson's life was cut short when he died in a mountaineering accident at the age of 28, but his posthumously-published book Kummer's Quartic Surface allows mathematicians today access to his work.

He was the son of W.H.H. Hudson, Professor of mathematics at King's College London. Hudson's sister, Hilda Hudson was likewise a gifted mathematician, being a graduate of Newnham, a lecturer at the University of Berlin, and ultimately being awarded the O.B.E. in 1919.

Publications

References

1876 births
1904 deaths
19th-century English mathematicians
20th-century English mathematicians
People from Cambridge
Alumni of St John's College, Cambridge
Fellows of St John's College, Cambridge
Alumni of the University of London
People associated with the University of Liverpool
Senior Wranglers
Algebraic geometers
Mountaineering deaths
Accidental deaths in Wales
British mountain climbers